Fuk Hang Tsuen is a village in Lam Tei, Tuen Mun District, Hong Kong.

Administration
Fuk Hang Tsuen contains Fuk Hang Tsuen (Lower) and Fuk Hang Tsuen (Upper), two of the 36 villages represented within the Tuen Mun Rural Committee. For electoral purposes, Fuk Hang Tsuen is part of the Fu Tai constituency.

References

External links

 Delineation of area of existing village Fuk Hang Tsuen (Lower) (Tuen Mun) for election of resident representative (2019 to 2022)
 Delineation of area of existing village Fuk Hang Tsuen (Upper) (Tuen Mun) for election of resident representative (2019 to 2022)

Villages in Tuen Mun District, Hong Kong
Lam Tei